Aboriginal language may refer to:

 Indigenous language
 Australian Aboriginal languages
 Taiwanese aboriginal languages
 Indigenous languages of the Americas
 Aboriginal Malay languages